Wilshire Country Club is an 18-hole private golf club on the West Coast of the United States, located in Los Angeles, California. 

The club in Hancock Park was founded  in 1919 and its Norman Macbeth-designed course opened the following year.

Tour events
Wilshire was the site of the Los Angeles Open on the PGA Tour four times (1928, 1931, 1933, 1944) and the SBC Senior Classic on the senior tour for six seasons (1995–2000). On the LPGA Tour, it hosted the Office Depot Championship in 2001 and currently is the home of the DIO Implant LA Open, which debuted in 2018. In 2023, the tournament moves to the Palos Verdes Golf Club.

Club professionals
Notables who have served as the club professional include Olin Dutra, Ellsworth Vines, and Jerry Barber; the latter two hold the course record of 61.

Course

For the Hugel-JTBC LA Open in 2018, hole #10 was the final hole.

References

External links

Golf Atlas – Wilshire Country Club

Golf clubs and courses in Los Angeles
Landmarks in Los Angeles
Clubs and societies in the United States
Sports organizations established in 1919
Buildings and structures in Los Angeles
1919 establishments in California